2014 Academy Awards may refer to:

 86th Academy Awards, the Academy Awards ceremony which took place in 2014
 87th Academy Awards, the Academy Awards ceremony which took place in 2015 honoring the best in film for 2014